Kimberly Po (born October 20, 1971) is a former professional tennis player from the United States.

In her career, she won the mixed doubles title at Wimbledon in 2000, partnering Donald Johnson. She also was a runner-up at the US Open in women's doubles in 2001, partnering Nathalie Tauziat, as well as at the 1999 US Open in mixed doubles, with Johnson.

Po won six top-level doubles titles. Her career-high world rankings were world No. 6 in doubles (in 2001) and No. 14 in singles (in 1997). Her best singles performance at a Grand Slam event came at the 1997 Australian Open when she reached the quarterfinals before being knocked out by Amanda Coetzer.

Po married Oliver Messerli in 2001, and was known thereafter as Kimberly Po-Messerli.

Grand Slam finals

Doubles: 1 (0–1)

Mixed: 2 (1–1)

WTA career finals

Doubles: 19 (5 titles, 14 runner-ups)

External links
 
 
 

American female tennis players
American sportspeople of Chinese descent
Tennis players from Los Angeles
Wimbledon champions
1971 births
Living people
Chinese-American tennis players
US Open (tennis) junior champions
Grand Slam (tennis) champions in mixed doubles
Grand Slam (tennis) champions in girls' doubles
21st-century American women